Following is a list of senators of Saint Pierre and Miquelon, people who have represented the collectivity of Saint Pierre and Miquelon in the Senate of France.

Fifth Republic 
Senators for Saint-Pierre-et-Miquelon under the French Fifth Republic have been:

References

Sources

 
Lists of members of the Senate (France) by department